Albert Daniel (Bert) Rechichar (July 16, 1930 – July 19, 2019) was an American football defensive back and kicker who played with the National Football League (NFL)'s Cleveland Browns, Baltimore Colts, and Pittsburgh Steelers from  to . He also played for the American Football League (AFL)'s New York Titans in 1961. While playing for the Colts in 1953, Rechichar kicked a 56-yard field goal, setting an NFL record that stood for 17 years as the longest. He was twice selected for the NFL Pro Bowl.

Early years
Born in Belle Vernon, Pennsylvania, Rechichar was the youngest of ten children. Rechichar played college football at the University of Tennessee and was an outfielder on the baseball team, helping the Volunteers to the 1951 College World Series. He later played in the farm system of the Cleveland Indians, reaching as high as Reading in the Class A Eastern League.

NFL career
Rechichar was the tenth overall pick of the 1952 NFL Draft, selected by the Browns out of Tennessee.

Sportswriter John Steadman, reporting on the then-record setting field goal, said Rechichar "drove the kick clear over the back line from 56 yards ... while wearing a regular, soft-toed football shoe, not a square-toed kicking shoe." Rechichar also recorded three interceptions that day, including one that he took 36 yards to the end zone.

Personal life and death

Rechichar had two sons and a daughter. He died at age 89 in his hometown of Belle Vernon from various ailments, including Alzheimer's.

See also
 List of American Football League players

References

External links
 
 
 Obituary

1930 births
2019 deaths
American football defensive backs
Baltimore Colts players
Cleveland Browns players
New York Titans (AFL) players
People from Fayette County, Pennsylvania
Pittsburgh Steelers players
Players of American football from Pennsylvania
Sportspeople from the Pittsburgh metropolitan area
Tennessee Volunteers baseball players
Tennessee Volunteers football players
Western Conference Pro Bowl players